Bardeh Qel (also Romanized as Bardeh Qal; also known as Bardakal, Bardeh Gol, Bardeh Qīl, and Bardqol) is a village in Lahijan Rural District, in the Central District of Piranshahr County, West Azerbaijan Province, Iran. At the 2006 census, its population was 244, in 29 families.

References 

Populated places in Piranshahr County